A dystrophin-associated protein is a protein that helps to form the connection between intracellular dystrophin and the extracellular basal lamina.

Examples include sarcoglycan and dystroglycan.

References

Human proteins